is the combination of the words kagi meaning hook and  nawa meaning rope. The kaginawa is a type of grappling hook used as a tool in feudal Japan by the samurai class, their retainers, foot soldiers and reportedly by ninja.  Kaginawa have several configurations, from one to four hooks. The kagi would be attached to a nawa of varying length; this was then used to scale a rather large wall, to secure a boat, or for hanging up armor and other equipment during the night. Kaginawa were  regularly used during various sieges of miscellaneous castles. The nawa was attached to a ring on one end which could be used to hang it from a saddle.

References

External links

Samurai weapons and equipment
Chain and rope throwing weapons
Ninjutsu artefacts